Seppo Vilhelm Lindström (born May 16, 1941 in Turku, Finland) is a retired professional ice hockey player who played in the SM-liiga.  He played in three Olympic games for Finland.

Career 
Lindstrom played for TuTo Turku and TPS.  He also played a season in Austria for Klagenfurter AC and four seasons in the Bundesliga for Berliner SC.

Linstrom played in the 1968, 1972, and 1976 Winter Olympics.  He also played in the 1969, 1971, 1973, 1974, 1975, and 1977 IIHF World Championships.

Lindstom was inducted into the Finnish Hockey Hall of Fame in 1987.

Sources

1941 births
Living people
Berliner SC players
Finnish ice hockey defencemen
Ice hockey players at the 1968 Winter Olympics
Ice hockey players at the 1972 Winter Olympics
Ice hockey players at the 1976 Winter Olympics
EC KAC players
Olympic ice hockey players of Finland
Sportspeople from Turku
HC TPS players
TuTo players